Robert Butler  was an American military officer and acting governor of East Florida between 10 July 1821 and 11 July 1821, after Florida was ceded to the United States by Spain.

Robert Butler was born in 1786.  In his youth, he joined the U.S. Army, attaining the ranks of colonel and commander.

Shortly after the death of his father Thomas Butler, Robert Butler and his siblings became wards of future president Andrew Jackson. He was a graduate of West Point and later served with distinction in the War of 1812. He served in the Battle of New Orleans as Jackson's adjutant.

Later, José María Coppinger delivered East Florida to Butler, who served as the representative of Jackson. He was named acting Governor of East Florida on 10 July 1821; but he was in charge for only two days, until the arrival of John R. Bell.

He was later appointed as the first surveyor general of the territory of Florida and settled on a plantation near Lake Jackson located to the north of Tallahassee.

Robert Butler died in 1860. He is the namesake of the city of Lake Butler, Florida.

See also
St. Johns County, Florida - history

References 

Royal Governors of La Florida
People from Tallahassee, Florida
United States Army officers
People of the Creek War